Chrysocraspeda ozophanes is a species of moth in the family Geometridae first described by Louis Beethoven Prout in 1918. It is found in Peninsular Malaysia and Borneo.

External links

Sterrhinae
Moths described in 1918
Moths of Borneo